Cigales is a municipality in Province of Valladolid, Spain. , it has a population of 5,032.

References 

Municipalities in the Province of Valladolid